Marlène Kasaj Yav (born 25 January 2003), known as Marlène Kasaj, is a DR Congolese footballer, who plays as a forward for ALG Spor in the Turkish Women's Super League, and the DR Congo women's national team.

Club career 
Kasaj has played for AC Léopards in the Republic of the Congo and for Amani in the Democratic Republic of the Congo.

In 2021, she moved to Turkey to join the Turkish Women's Super League club Adana İdmanyurduspor.

On 7 July 2022, she transferred to the Gaziantep-based league champion club ALG Spor. she debuted in the 2022–23 UEFA Women's Champions League on 18 August 2022.

International caree r
Kasaj capped for the DR Congo at senior level during the 2020 CAF Women's Olympic Qualifying Tournament (third round).

Career statistics 
.

See also 
 List of Democratic Republic of the Congo women's international footballers

References

External links

1996 births
Living people
People from Lubumbashi
Democratic Republic of the Congo women's footballers
Women's association football forwards
Adana İdmanyurduspor players
Turkish Women's Football Super League players
Democratic Republic of the Congo women's international footballers
Democratic Republic of the Congo expatriate footballers
Democratic Republic of the Congo expatriate sportspeople in the Republic of the Congo
Expatriate footballers in the Republic of the Congo
Democratic Republic of the Congo expatriate sportspeople in Turkey
Expatriate women's footballers in Turkey
21st-century Democratic Republic of the Congo people
ALG Spor players